The Kharkiv State Academy of Design and Arts or KSADA is an art institute in Kharkiv, Ukraine. Founded in 1921, it is one of the oldest Ukrainian higher education institutions. It is operated under the Ministry of Culture of Ukraine as a public university, and holds level IV accreditation in Ukraine. The academy is structured into four faculties: the Faculty of Fine Art, the Faculty of Design, the Faculty of Environmental Design and the Faculty of Audiovisual and Extramural Studies.

Notable аlumni
Anatoliy Nasedkin (1924 – 1994), Soviet Ukrainian painter and recipient of the Shevchenko National Prize
Nikolai Bartossik (1951 – ), Ukrainian-American painter
Pavlo Makov (1958 – ), Ukrainian artist
Roman Kost (1984 – ), Ukrainian sculptor
Sergei Sviatchenko (1952 – ), Ukrainian-Danish collage artist
Viktor Poltavets (1925 – 2003), Soviet Ukrainian artist and People's Artist of Ukraine
Victor Sydorenko (1953 – ), Ukrainian painter and vice president of the National Academy of Arts of Ukraine
Yauhen Shatokhin (1947 – 2012), Belarusian painter and political activist
Yevhen Yehorov (1917 – 2005), Soviet-Ukrainian graphic artist and Honored Artist of Ukraine

See also
Kharkiv State School of Art
Kharkiv State Academy of Culture

References

Universities and colleges in Kharkiv
Education in the Soviet Union
1921 establishments in Ukraine
Educational institutions established in 1921
National universities in Ukraine
Art schools in Ukraine